Pesher (pl. pesharim), from the Hebrew root meaning "interpretation," is a group of interpretive commentaries on scripture. The pesharim commentaries became known from the discovery of the Dead Sea Scrolls. The pesharim give a theory of scriptural interpretation of a number of biblical texts from the Hebrew Bible, such as Habakkuk and Psalms.

The authors of pesharim believe that scripture is written in two levels; the surface level for ordinary readers with limited knowledge, and the concealed level for specialists with higher knowledge. This is most clearly spelled out in the Habakkuk Pesher (1QpHab), where the author of the text asserts that God has made known to the Teacher of Righteousness, a prominent figure in the history of the Essene community, "all the mysteries of his servants the prophets" (1QpHab VII:4–5). By contrast, the prophets, and other readers of the texts, only had a partial interpretation revealed to them. The result of this pesher method creates a fixed-literary structure, which is seen most in the continuous Pesharim, with the goal of giving the plain meaning of the prophets' words.

Types 
There are two types of pesharim found in the dead sea scrolls: "Continuous pesharim" and "Thematic pesharim."

Continuous 
The first type of pesharim, continuous pesharim, go through specific biblical books and quote the book phrase by phrase; after each quotation, an interpretation of the verse is added. There are 15 continuous pesharim that have been found and dated, including: five on Isaiah (4Q161, 4Q162, 4Q163, 4Q164, 4Q165); three on the Psalms (1Q16, 4Q171, 4Q173); and seven on books of the Minor Prophets (1QpHab on Habakkuk; 1Q14 on Micah; 1Q15 and 4Q170 on Zephaniah; 4Q166 and 4Q167 on Hosea; 4Q169 on Nahum). Below is an example of continuous pesharim from 1QpHab:

"Behold the nations and see, marvel and be astonished; for I accomplish a deed in your days, but you will not believe it when told" [Hab 1.5].

Thematic 
The other type of pesharim, Thematic pesharim, are similar to continuous pesharim in that they comment on and cite from biblical verses, but thematic pesharim focus on a particular theme (eg. "the end of days") and pull from multiple biblical books as opposed to commenting on books verse by verse. In these texts, scriptural books were connected and therefore a passage or verse in one book, could be interpreted or clarified by passages or verses found either later in the same book, or even another text.  An example of thematic pesharim is text 4Q174, which is known as Florilegium.  This scroll discuses several biblical texts including: 2 Sam 7, Ps 1 & 2, Exod 15, Ezek 37, Isa 8 & 65, and Amos.  It looks at these texts with messianic implications and characterizes the Davidic Messiah as God's son.

Historic individuals
The Pesharim contain references to a number of individuals and groups throughout its interpretation of the texts. As the Pesharim refer to specific events and makes mention of these specific individuals, the Pesharim are important in understanding the Qumran's history and culture during the times that they lived. Below are the most prominent individuals and groups cited.

Teacher of Righteousness: The Teacher of Righteousness is spoken, referred, and cited in many of the Pesharim including: the Damascus Document, the Habakkuk Commentary, the Commentary on the Psalms, and many others. The Teacher of Righteousness is the main spiritual leader of the Essenes at Qumran, and his exact identity is unknown. The Teacher of Righteousness is believed by many scholars to have been the author of some of the texts found at Qumran, such as the Teacher Hymns. Throughout the Pesharim, the 'interpreter' who writes the Pesher can be seen identifying biblical individuals as if they are actually The Teacher of Righteousness, such as that found in Psalms 37 in the ''Commentaries on Psalms which states;

"I have been young, and now I am old, but I have not seen a righteous man abandoned and his children begging foodAll the time he is lending generously, and [his] chil[dren] are blessed (37:25–26)[This] refers to the Teacher of [Righteousness . . ]" (4Q171 Col.3)

Wicked Priest: The Wicked Priest is the Teacher of Righteousness's main opponent, who also sought to kill the Teacher of Righteousness. The identity of the Wicked Priest is more clear than that of the Teacher of Righteousness, with scholars suggesting that he was a Hasmonean high priest such as Jonathan Apphus and Alexander Jannaeus. The Wicked Priest is referenced the most in the Commentary on Habukkuk, which states that the Wicked Priest was originally reliable, but once he became ruler he forsook God for riches and rebelled against God and committed abhorrent deeds. In the Commentary on the Psalms, the Wicked Priest sought to kill the Teacher of Righteousness for sending a law to him, some scholars have suggested that this law was 4QMMT. If the Wicked Priest was in fact Jonathan, then he met his own end in 142 BCE at the hands of Diodotus Tryphon, which would match well with the Habakkuk Commentary that comments on the terrible end met by the Wicked Priest.

Man of Mockery: The Teacher of Righteousness also had opponents in relation to the interpretation of scripture and the law who grew out of the Qumran communities own ranks. The Man of Mockery is one such individual who rejected the Teacher of Righteousness's claims and therefore withdrew himself from the group, and took some followers with him, who were then referred to as the Men of Mockery.

The Man of Lie: The Teacher of Righteousness's opponent was also called the Man of Lie. This individual, according to the Pesharim on Psalms, is prophesied in scripture, and was indeed successful in leading people astray.

Kittim: A group called the Kittim is mentioned in several Pesher including: Apocalypse of Weeks, Pesher on Isaiah, Pesher Habakkuk, and Pesher Nahum. The Kittim are usually identified as the Romans. The Kittim are portrayed as Gentiles, who will play a role in the great wars of the end times.

Themes 
Within the pesharim found at Qumran, different themes occur within separate texts.

Salvation
The Pesher on Psalms has the theme of salvation that takes part of an interpretation on those who are wrongdoers before the eyes of God and how those who do good will see the rewards of life. For instance, 4Q171 Fragment 1 is about how it is important that as a devoted believer you shall respect the Law and those who don’t will not be saved. "Renounce your anger and abandon your resentment, don't yearn to do evil, because evildoers will be wiped out" (37:8–9a). It is significant to take into account the fact that such interpretations of the psalms have shown to have a deeper meaning and connects all human beings. All this by simply splitting up those who are good and those who are not.

Apocalyptic
There are also apocalyptic themes that exist within the Pesharim. There are several interpretations with apocalyptic themes found in the commentaries within Qumran such as Pesher Isaiah and Pesher Habakkuk that talk about the fate of the enemies of Israel and several other apocalyptic events. Eventually, the primary objective of the existent research was to explore the creed of the apocalyptic war which is shown in the Dead Sea Scrolls. Moreover, when trying to get a better understanding of the origin of the apocalyptic war and of the characteristics of the Qumran community, it is often that a question raises up which mentions the identification of the enemy in the apocalyptic war.

Even then, several scholars have been more capable of identifying the resemblance between the belief of the Christian community and the Qumran. For instance, Stephen Goranson makes a particular assessment between both the Dead Sea scrolls and the book of Apocalypse. One significant factor to take into consideration would be comparing both the Apocalypse of John and the War Scroll. Both of them used the same tendency of using apocalyptic language. However, they differ by having totally distinct approaches and views upon the war.

Pesharim found at Qumran
 Continuous Pesharim
 1QpHab: (Habakkuk Pesher)
 1Q14 (Pesher Micah)
 4Q161–165: 4QpIsa a–e (Isaiah Pesher)
 4Q166–167: 4QpHos a–b (Hosea Pesher)
 4Q169: 4QpNah (Nahum Pesher)
 4Q170: 4QpZeph (Zephaniah Pesher)
 4Q171 & 173: 4QpPs a–b (Psalms Pesher)
 4Q172 (Unidentified Pesher)
 4Q247–4Q (Pesher on the Apocalypse of the Weeks)
 Thematic Pesharim
 4Q252 (Genesis Pesher)
 4Q174: 4Qflor (Eschatological Commentary A/Florilegium)
 4Q177 (Eschatological Commentary B)
 11Q13: 11QMelch (the Melchizedek Midrash)

References

Further reading
 Allegro, John M. (ed.), Qumran Cave 4, I (4Q 158 – 4Q 186), Discoveries in the Judean Desert (DJD), 5 (Oxford: Clarendon, 1968)
 Brownlee, William H., The Midrash Pesher of Habakkuk, Society of Biblical Literature Monograph Series, 24 (Scholars Press, 1979)
 Charlesworth, James H., The Pesharim and Qumran History: Chaos or Consensus? (Wm. B. Eerdmans Publishing Company, 2006)
 Doudna, Gregory L., 4Q Pesher Nahum: A Critical Edition, Journal for the Study of the Pseudepigrapha Supplement (Sheffield: Continuum International Publishing Group, 2002)
 Greidanus, Sidney, Preaching Christ from the Old Testament: A Contemporary Hermeneutical Method (Wm. B. Eerdmans Publishing Company, 1999)
 Horgan, Maurya P., Pesharim: Qumran Interpretations of Biblical Books, The Catholic Biblical Quarterly Monograph Series, 8 (Washington: The Catholic Biblical Association of America, 1979
 Lim, Timothy H., Pesharim, (Sheffield Academic Press, 2002)
 Eisenman, Robert  The New Testament Code: The Cup of the Lord, the Damascus Covenant, and the Blood of Christ (Sterling Publishing Company, Inc., Oct 28, 2006)
 Thiering, Barbara, Jesus the Man: Decoding the Real Story of Jesus and Mary Magdalene (Simon & Schulster: Atria Books, 2006)9)
 Van Gemeren, Willem A., Interpreting the Prophetic Word (Zondervan; New Ed edition, 1996)
 Wood, Marcus E. M., History and Prophecy in the Qumran Pesharim: an examination of the key figures and groups in the Dead Sea Scrolls by way of their prophetic designations (PhD, University of Durham, 2001)

External links

 Pesher and the Dead Sea Sectarians An Overview of the Pesher Technique in the Dead Sea Documents.
 The Pesher to Habakkuk – A discussion of Peshar commentary in the Dead Sea Scrolls—particularly to the transcription of Habakkuk.
 The pesher on Habakkuk (1QpHab) Barbara Thiering's interpretation of this pesher and its historical context.
 The Pesher Technique – Analysis of Dr. Thiering's rules of pesher.

Dead Sea Scrolls
Essene texts